Goephanes obliquepictus is a species of beetle in the family Cerambycidae. It was first described by Léon Fairmaire in 1903.

References

Goephanes
Beetles described in 1903
Taxa named by Léon Fairmaire